Zhao Tianshou (born 1961) is a Chinese scientist and educator currently serving as Cheong Ying Chan Professor of Engineering and Environment, the Chair Professor of Mechanical & Aerospace Engineering at Hong Kong University of Science and Technology.

Education
Zhao was born in 1961 in Shaanxi. He received his bachelor's degree and master's degree from Tianjin University in 1983 and 1986, respectively. He enrolled at the University of Hawaii at Manoa where he received his doctor's degree in 1995.

Career
In 1995 he joined the faculty of Hong Kong University of Science and Technology, becoming Chair Professor of its Department of Mechanical Engineering in 2011 and Dean of its Energy Research Institute in April 2014.

Honours and awards
 Fellow of the Royal Society of Chemistry (RSC)
 2007 Fellow of the American Society of Mechanical Engineers (ASME)
 2010 "Chang Jiang Scholar" (or " Yangtze River Scholar")
 2018 Science and Technology Award of the Ho Leung Ho Lee Foundation
 November 22, 2019 Member of the Chinese Academy of Sciences (CAS)

References

External links
Zhao Tianshou on the Hong Kong University of Science and Technology

1961 births
Living people
Scientists from Shaanxi
Tianjin University alumni
Academic staff of the Hong Kong University of Science and Technology
Fellows of the Royal Society of Chemistry
Members of the Chinese Academy of Sciences